Durgi (ದುರ್ಗಿ) is a 2004 Indian Kannada-language action film directed by P. Ravi Shankar who made his directorial debut and starring Malashri in the lead role. The film is about a female rowdy seeking revenge against politicians who raped and killed her sister.
 The film was officially remade in 2005 in Telugu as Narasimhudu starring Jr.Ntr. The film has been dubbed in Hindi as Main Hoon Durga and in Malayalam as Bhasmasuran.

Plot
Durgi was living happily with her family in a small village. But 2 businessmen entered the village to make a sugar mill. They used to be drunk always. One day, they raped her sister and she died in hospital. When Durgi and her family were in agony, they killed Durgi's father. After this, she promises to kill everyone.

Cast

Malashri as Durgi, Madikeri Rowdy
Ashish Vidyarthi as Shankar Deputy Police Commissioner of Bangalore City
Raghuvaran as JD (Jaydev)
Kalabhavan Mani as Marigudi
Avinash as Teacher
Doddanna as MLA
Sadhu Kokila as Durgi's friend
Honnavalli Krishna as Colony member
Tennis Krishna as Colony member
B. Jayashree as Durgi's grandmother 
Ramesh Bhat as Durgi's Father
Biradar as Doctor of colony
G. V. Sudhakar Naidu as Naga
P D Raju
Costume Krishna
B K Shankar
Dinesh Mangalore
Bharath Bhagavathar
Sarigama Viji
Sathyajith
Bullet Prakash
Michel Madhu
Mandeep Roy
Ramanand
Rajagopal
Sridhar
Jayaram
Kempegowda, Chandra
Ashalatha
Pankaja
Baby Arpitha
Master Ganesh

Soundtrack

Release 
it released in 2004. At that time it got mixed reviews

References

2004 films
Indian action films
Kannada films remade in other languages
Films scored by Hamsalekha
2000s Kannada-language films
Indian rape and revenge films
Films about rape in India
2004 directorial debut films
2004 action films